The president of the Ohio State Senate is the leader of the Ohio State Senate. Under Ohio's first constitution, in effect from 1803 to 1851, the presiding officer of the senate was called the speaker. Starting in 1851, when the second constitution took effect, a new office of lieutenant governor was created. The new position of lieutenant governor carried with it the office of president of the senate, and was nominally the presiding officer of the senate. During this time, the actual legislative leader of the senate majority was the president pro tempore of the Ohio Senate. In the 1970s, another change was made, which made the office of lieutenant governor elected jointly with the governor. At this time, the duty of presiding over the senate was removed from the lieutenant governor's portfolio and the majority party of the senate began electing its own president starting in 1979. The president is second in line to the office of the governor.

Speakers of the Ohio Senate, 1803–1851

Presidents pro tempore of the Ohio Senate, 1852–1978

(At this time, the nominal presiding officer of the senate was the Lieutenant Governor of Ohio.)

Presidents of the Ohio Senate, 1979–present

References

 - pre-1874 party affiliations

 
Presidents of the Ohio State Senate